Brane Mozetič (born 14 October 1958) is a Slovene poet, writer, editor and translator. He is known for his homoerotic poetry, his editorial work and his translations of works by Rimbaud, Genet and Foucault into Slovene.

Biography
Mozetič was born in Ljubljana in 1958. He studied Comparative literature and Literary theory at the University of Ljubljana and graduated in 1983. He works as the editor of the literary collections Aleph and Lambda at the Centre for Slovenian Literature. In 2003 he won the Jenko Award for his poetry collection Banalije (Banalities).
He has edited four anthologies of LGBT literature and several presentations of contemporary Slovenian literature. He has more than forty books in translation, his poetry collection Banalije (Banalities, 2003) alone being translated into twelve languages, making him one of the most translated contemporary Slovenian authors. He also organises translation workshops, readings of Slovenian authors abroad, a small literary and music festival Living Literature, the Ljubljana LGBT Film Festival, etc.

Published works

Poetry collections
 , 1976
 , 1978
 , 1982
 , 1986
 , 1987
 , 1989
 /Obsession, slov. – franc. izdaja, 1991
 , 1995
 , 2000
 , 2003
 , 2005
 , 2007
 , 2011
 , 2013
 , Škuc 2018

Prose
 , 1993
 , 1996
 , 2001
 , 2015

Books for children
 , 2013
 , 2014
 , 2014
 , 2016
 , 2017

Books in translation
 Obsedenost / Obsession, Aleph – Ed. Genevieve Pastre, Ljubljana – Paris 1991
 Anđeli, Meandar, Zagreb 2000
 Parole che bruciano / Besede, ki žgejo, Mobydick, Faenza 2002
 Obsession, Ecrits des Forges, Quebec 2002
 Butterflies,  Meeting Eyes Bindery, New York 2004
 Schattenengel, Passagen Verlag, Wien 2004
 He somiat que havies mort (&Svetlana Makarovič), Emboscal + ILC, Barcelona 2004
 Poemas por los suenos muertos, CEDMA, Malaga 2004
 Banalii, Blesok, Skopje 2004
 Leptiri, DAN, Zagreb 2005
 Passion, Talisman House, Jersey City 2005
 To nie jest księga seksu, Wydawnictwo Zielona Sowa, Kraków 2005
 Metulji / mariposas, Ediciones Gog y Magog, Buenos Aires 2006
 Banalni neshta, Izdatelstvo Karina M., Sofija 2006
 Die verlorene Geschichte, Sisyphus, Klagenfurt 2006
 Borboletas, Editorial 100, Vila Nova de Gaia 2007
 Passion, ZOE edizioni, Forli 2007
 Schmetterlinge, Sisyphus Verlag, Klagenfurt 2008
 Banalities, A Midsummer Night's Press, New York 2008
 Andělé, Větrné mlýny, Brno 2009
 Farfalle, Edizioni ETS/Alleo, Pisa 2009
 Banalitats, Eumo Editorial, Vic 2009
 Banalien, Männerschwarm Verlag, Hamburg 2010
 Storia perduta, Beit Casa Editrice, Trieste 2010
 Banality, Adolescent, Zabreh 2011
 Banalità, Edizioni del Leone, Venezia 2011
 Banalidades, Ediciones Gog y Magog, Buenos Aires 2011
 Lost Story, Talisman House, Jersey City 2011
 Banalije, Altagama, Zagreb 2012
 Banalnošči, Raduga, Kyiv 2012
 Gharaq Xortohra (&Suzana Tratnik), Inizjamed, Valletta 2013
 Banalidades, Visor libros, Madrid 2013
 El pais de las bombas, Bellaterra, Barcelona 2014
 El pais dels bombes, Bellaterra, Barcelona 2014
 Bilad alkanabil wa bilad alhašaiš, Sefsafa, Kairo 2014
 Pasión, Dos Bigotes, Madrid 2014
 Nedovršene skice jedne revolucije, h,d,p, Zagreb 2015
 Banalités, Maison de la poésie, Tinqueux 2015
 Banalien 2, Sisyphus Verlag, Klagenfurt 2016
 Mi primer amor, Bellaterra, Barcelona 2016
 Possesão, Roma Editora, Lisboa 2016
 Il coniglio di Alja, Asterios Editore, Trieste, 2016
 Com’è verde il mondo senza le bombe della guerra, Asterios Editore, Trieste, 2016
 Mugiuittang aideul, Hanulimkids Publishing, Seoul 2016
 Mania, Raduga, Kyiv 2017
 Första kärleken, Vombat förlag, Färjestaden 2017
 Que teñas unha lectura solitaria, Chan da Pólvora Ed., Santiago de Compostela 2017
 Esbozos inacabados de una revolución, Baile del Sol, Tegueste 2017
 Unfinished Sketches of a Revolution, Talisman House, Northfield 2018
 Umarmungen des Wahnsinns, Sisyphus Verlag, Klagenfurt 2018
 Cheot Sarang, Oomzicc Publisher, Seoul 2018

References

External links

 Brane Mozetič personal site

Slovenian poets
Slovenian male poets
Slovenian translators
Slovenian editors
Writers from Ljubljana
Living people
1958 births
University of Ljubljana alumni
Slovenian LGBT people
LGBT poets
21st-century LGBT people